Bad Ideas may refer to:
 Bad Ideas (album), a 2019 album by Tessa Violet
 "Bad Ideas", a 2016 song by Alle Farben
 "Bad Ideas", a 2018 song by Tessa Violet
 Bad Ideas Festival, a student event at MIT

See also 
Bad Idea (disambiguation)